Harry Roberts (27 June 1904 – 18 May 1968) was an English professional footballer who made 409 appearances in the Football League playing for Leeds United, Plymouth Argyle and Bristol Rovers. He played as a right back.

Roberts was born in Crofton, in what is now West Yorkshire. He played as an amateur for Castleford Town before joining Leeds United, for whom he made his debut in the Football League during the 1925–26 season. He made 84 League appearances for Leeds before moving on to Plymouth Argyle, where he was a regular first-team selection for seven seasons and played more than 250 games for the club in all competitions. He left for Bristol Rovers in 1937, and returned to Yorkshire in 1939 to play for Frickley Colliery. He died in 1968 in the Royal Naval Hospital, Stonehouse, aged 63.

References

1904 births
1968 deaths
People from Crofton, West Yorkshire
Footballers from Yorkshire
English footballers
Association football defenders
Castleford Town F.C. players
Leeds United F.C. players
Plymouth Argyle F.C. players
Bristol Rovers F.C. players
Frickley Athletic F.C. players
English Football League players